The G.I. Executioner, originally titled Wit's End, is a 1975 action film directed by Joel M. Reed and written by Keith Lorenz, Ian Ward, and Reed. Shot in Singapore, production finished in 1971, but the film was not released in theatres until 1975. The film was also released under the title Dragon Lady.

Overview
Tom Keena plays a Vietnam veteran and millionaire freelance journalist who spends his time operating a discotheque in Singapore. When he receives a mysterious offer to investigate a defecting Chinese scientist, he finds himself mixed up with a dastardly Communist agent and his voluptuous stripper mistress.

See also
 List of American films of 1971
 List of Troma films

References

External links

1971 films
1971 action films
American independent films
Troma Entertainment films
Films shot in Singapore
Films set in Singapore
Films directed by Joel M. Reed
American action films
1970s English-language films
1970s American films
1971 independent films
English-language action films